Adrienne Elizabeth Clarke  (née Petty; born 6 January 1938) is Professor Emeritus of Botany at the University of Melbourne, where she ran the Plant Cell Biology Research Centre from 1982–1999. She is a former chairman of the Commonwealth Scientific and Industrial Research Organisation (CSIRO, 1991–1996), former Lieutenant Governor of Victoria (1997–2000) and former Chancellor of La Trobe University (2011–2017).

Biography
Born in Melbourne, Clarke reports she experienced some sexism as a bright student in the 1950s. She attended Ruyton Girls' School and entered the University of Melbourne in 1955 where she was a resident of Janet Clarke Hall (then still part of Trinity College) reading Science. She graduated with an Honours degree in Biological Sciences in 1959, and gained her PhD in 1963. She married Charles Peter Clarke on 14 August 1959.

In 1964 she became a research fellow at the United Dental Hospital of Sydney, then moved to Baylor University in Houston and the University of Michigan, later teaching at the University of Auckland. She worked at the University of Melbourne as Research Fellow (1969–1977), then lecturer, senior lecturer and reader before being appointed Professor of Botany in 1985 and Laureate Professor in 1999.  She retired from the University in 2005.

Clarke is a former chairman of CSIRO (1991–1996) and a former Lieutenant Governor of Victoria (1997–2000). She is a  Fellow of Janet Clarke Hall at the University of Melbourne. In 2010 she joined the La Trobe University Council, and succeeded Sylvia Walton as Chancellor of La Trobe University on 26 February 2011.

She has also been involved in the commercial sector; she was a director of a number of public companies and sat on a number of boards, including Western Mining, Alcoa, Fisher and Paykel, Woolworths and the AMP Society.  She was also a member of the Australian Advisory Board of the Global Nature Conservancy. In 1998, in association with three University of Melbourne colleagues, she founded the agribusiness Hexima.

Contributions

Clarke's scientific work provided critical insight to the biochemistry and genetics of flowering plants, their reproduction, and their growth. It led to industrial applications for next-generation controls of insect pests and fungal disease of crops. Her team was the first to clone the gene which regulates self-compatibility in plants and the first to clone the "c" DNA of an Arabinogalactan Protein.

She describes her expertise as:
The molecular basis of self-incompatibility
The chemistry and biology of a class of proteoglycans, the arabinogalactan-proteins
Proteinase Inhibitors and their use in control of insect development 

She is co-editor of major scientific books dealing with chemistry, cell biology and genetics.

Honours and awards
Fellow of the Australian Academy of Science (FAA)
Fellow of the Australian Academy of Technological Sciences and Engineering (FTSE)
1991 Officer of the Order of Australia (AO)
1992 ANZAAS Mueller Medal
1993 Outstanding Achievers Award, National Australia Day Council
2001 Centenary Medal
2001 Victorian Honour Roll of Women
2004 Companion of the Order of Australia (AC)
Foreign Associate of the National Academy of Sciences (USA)
Foreign Member of the American Academy of Arts and Sciences (USA)

References

External links

 Laurence Muir (2007) Professor Adrienne Clarke, pp17–20 of: "Some Inspirational People" – 15 inspirational Australians profiled by Sir Laurence MacDonald Muir.

1938 births
Living people
People educated at Ruyton Girls' School
People educated at Trinity College (University of Melbourne)
20th-century Australian botanists
Companions of the Order of Australia
Fellows of the Australian Academy of Science
Fellows of the Australian Academy of Technological Sciences and Engineering
Foreign associates of the National Academy of Sciences
Academic staff of the University of Melbourne
20th-century Australian women scientists
Women botanists
Chancellors of La Trobe University
University of Michigan fellows
Lieutenant-Governors of Victoria
American women academics